The 2020–21 Chicago Bulls season was the 55th season of the franchise in the National Basketball Association (NBA). On April 13, 2020, Arturas Karnišovas was named executive vice president of basketball operations by the Bulls. The Bulls replaced Jim Boylen, with former Oklahoma City Thunder coach Billy Donovan on September 22.

Draft picks 

Before the start of the 2020 NBA draft period, the Bulls' selection was originally held stuck at the #7 selection before the NBA suspended their season on March 12, 2020 and cancelled the rest of Chicago's season by June 5. Chicago had the second-best record of teams that had their seasons cancelled during that period. On the night of the 2020 NBA draft lottery, the Bulls moved up three spots from the seventh selection to the fourth pick of the draft. The Bulls also have a second-round selection at #44, but that selection was acquired from the Memphis Grizzlies after their own second-round pick was traded to the Washington Wizards.

Roster

Standings

Division

Conference

Notes
 z – Clinched home court advantage for the entire playoffs
 c – Clinched home court advantage for the conference playoffs
 y – Clinched division title
 x – Clinched playoff spot
 pb – Clinched play-in spot
 o – Eliminated from playoff contention
 * – Division leader

Game log

Preseason

|- style="background:#fcc;"
| 1
| December 11
| Houston
| 
| Coby White (15)
| Vonleh, Gafford (8)
| Satoranský, White (6)
| United Center0
| 0–1
|- style="background:#cfc;"
| 2
| December 13
| Houston
| 
| Zach LaVine (23)
| Zach LaVine (9)
| Arcidiacono, LaVine, White (5)
| United Center0
| 1–1
|- style="background:#cfc;"
| 3
| December 16
| @ Oklahoma City
| 
| Coby White (27)
| Otto Porter Jr. (12)
| Zach LaVine (5)
| Chesapeake Energy Arena0
| 2–1
|- style="background:#cfc;"
| 4
| December 18
| @ Oklahoma City
| 
| Lauri Markkanen (22)
| Coby White (9)
| Wendell Carter Jr. (6)
| Chesapeake Energy Arena0
| 3–1

Regular season 

|-style="background:#fcc;"
| 1
| December 23
| Atlanta
| 
| Zach LaVine (22)
| Lauri Markkanen (7)
| Coby White (7)
| United Center0
| 0–1
|-style="background:#fcc;"
| 2
| December 26
| Indiana
| 
| Zach LaVine (17)
| Lauri Markkanen (9)
| Tomáš Satoranský (9)
| United Center0
| 0–2
|-style="background:#fcc;"
| 3
| December 27
| Golden State
| 
| Zach LaVine (33)
| Wendell Carter Jr. (13)
| Coby White (5)
| United Center0
| 0–3
|-style="background:#cfc;"
| 4
| December 29
| @ Washington
| 
| Zach LaVine (23)
| Wendell Carter Jr. (12)
| LaVine, Satoranský, White (6)
| Capital One Arena0
| 1–3
|-style="background:#cfc;"
| 5
| December 31
| @ Washington
| 
| Otto Porter Jr. (28)
| Otto Porter Jr. (12)
| Coby White (10)
| Capital One Arena0
| 2–3

|-style="background:#fcc;"
| 6
| January 1
| @ Milwaukee
| 
| Zach LaVine (16)
| LaVine, Williams (6)
| Carter Jr., Felicio, White (3)
| Fiserv Forum0
| 2–4
|-style="background:#cfc;"
| 7
| January 3
| Dallas
| 
| Zach LaVine (39)
| Carter Jr., Porter Jr., White (7)
| Zach LaVine (5)
| United Center0
| 3–4
|-style="background:#cfc;"
| 8
| January 5
| @ Portland
| 
| Coby White (21)
| Otto Porter Jr. (13)
| Zach LaVine (9)
| Moda Center0
| 4–4
|-style="background:#fcc;"
| 9
| January 6
| @ Sacramento
| 
| Coby White (36)
| Wendell Carter Jr. (17)
| Coby White (7)
| Golden 1 Center0
| 4–5
|-style="background:#fcc;"
| 10
| January 8
| @ LA Lakers
| 
| Zach LaVine (38)
| Patrick Williams (8)
| Zach LaVine (6)
| Staples Center0
| 4–6
|-style="background:#fcc;"
| 11
| January 10
| @ LA Clippers
| 
| Zach LaVine (45)
| Coby White (8)
| Coby White (13)
| Staples Center0
| 4–7
|-style="background:#ccc;"
| PPD
| January 12
| Boston
| colspan="6" | Postponed (COVID-19) (Makeup date: May 7)
|-style="background:#fcc;"
| 12
| January 15
| @ Oklahoma City
| 
| Zach LaVine (35)
| Wendell Carter Jr. (11)
| Coby White (7)
| Chesapeake Energy Arena0
| 4–8
|-style="background:#cfc;"
| 13
| January 17
| @ Dallas
| 
| Lauri Markkanen (29)
| Lauri Markkanen (10)
| Zach LaVine (10)
| American Airlines Center0
| 5–8
|-style="background:#cfc;"
| 14
| January 18
| Houston
| 
| Zach LaVine (33)
| Thaddeus Young (9)
| Zach LaVine (7)
| United Center0
| 6–8
|-style="background:#cfc;"
| 15
| January 22
| @ Charlotte
| 
| Zach LaVine (25)
| Otto Porter Jr. (8)
| Zach LaVine (9)
| Spectrum Center0
| 7–8
|-style="background:#fcc;"
| 16
| January 23
| LA Lakers
| 
| Zach LaVine (21)
| Zach LaVine (10)
| LaVine, White (4)
| United Center0
| 7–9
|-style="background:#fcc;"
| 17
| January 25
| Boston
| 
| Zach LaVine (30)
| Thaddeus Young (9)
| Thaddeus Young (9)
| United Center0
| 7–10
|-style="background:#ccc;"
| PPD
| January 27
| @ Memphis
| colspan="6" | Postponed (COVID-19) (Makeup date: April 12)
|-style="background:#fcc;"
| 18
| January 30
| Portland
| 
| Lauri Markkanen (31)
| Thaddeus Young (11)
| Thaddeus Young (11)
| United Center0
| 7–11

|-style="background:#cfc;"
| 19
| February 1
| New York
| 
| Lauri Markkanen (30)
| Daniel Gafford (9)
| Thaddeus Young (8)
| United Center0
| 8–11
|-style="background:#fcc;"
| 20
| February 3
| New York
| 
| Zach LaVine (24)
| Patrick Williams (7)
| Zach LaVine (7)
| United Center0
| 8–12
|-style="background:#fcc;"
| 21
| February 5
| @ Orlando
| 
| Zach LaVine (26)
| Williams, Young (7)
| Zach LaVine (8)
| Amway Center3,535
| 8–13
|-style="background:#cfc;"
| 22
| February 6
| @ Orlando
| 
| Zach LaVine (39)
| Patrick Williams (10)
| Tomáš Satoranský (6)
| Amway Center3,880
| 9–13
|-style="background:#fcc;"
| 23
| February 8
| Washington
| 
| Zach LaVine (35)
| Garrett Temple (9)
| LaVine, Young (6)
| United Center0
| 9–14
|-style="background:#cfc;"
| 24
| February 10
| New Orleans
| 
| Zach LaVine (46)
| LaVine, Young (7)
| Tomáš Satoranský (8)
| United Center0
| 10–14
|-style="background:#fcc;"
| 25
| February 12
| LA Clippers
| 
| Zach LaVine (26)
| Zach LaVine (9)
| Tomáš Satoranský (7)
| United Center0
| 10–15
|-style="background:#cfc;"
| 26
| February 15
| @ Indiana
| 
| Zach LaVine (30)
| Thaddeus Young (11)
| Coby White (8)
| Bankers Life Fieldhouse0
| 11–15
|-style="background:#ccc;"
| PPD
| February 17
| @ Charlotte
| colspan="6" | Postponed (COVID-19) (Makeup date: May 6)
|-style="background:#cfc;"
| 27
| February 17
| Detroit
| 
| Zach LaVine (37)
| Thaddeus Young (10)
| Thaddeus Young (7)
| United Center0
| 12–15
|-style="background:#fcc;"
| 28
| February 19
| @ Philadelphia
| 
| Zach LaVine (30)
| Thaddeus Young (9)
| LaVine, White (5)
| Wells Fargo Center0
| 12–16
|-style="background:#cfc;"
| 29
| February 20
| Sacramento
| 
| Zach LaVine (38)
| Patrick Williams (11)
| Wendell Carter Jr. (5)
| United Center0
| 13–16
|-style="background:#cfc;"
| 30
| February 22
| @ Houston
| 
| Coby White (24)
| Wendell Carter Jr. (13)
| Zach LaVine (6)
| Toyota Center3,025
| 14–16
|-style="background:#cfc;"
| 31
| February 24
| Minnesota
| 
| Zach LaVine (35)
| Wendell Carter Jr. (10)
| White, Young (6)
| United Center0
| 15–16
|-style="background:#fcc;"
| 32
| February 26
| Phoenix
| 
| Zach LaVine (24)
| Thaddeus Young (10)
| Thaddeus Young (5)
| United Center0
| 15–17
|-style="background:#ccc;"
| PPD
| February 28
| @ Toronto
| colspan="6" | Postponed (COVID-19) (Makeup date: April 8)

|-style="background:#fcc;"
| 33
| March 1
| Denver
| 
| Zach LaVine (23)
| Coby White (10)
| LaVine, Satoranský (5)
| United Center0
| 15–18
|-style="background:#cfc;"
| 34
| March 3
| @ New Orleans
| 
| Zach LaVine (36)
| Wendell Carter Jr. (15)
| Zach LaVine (8)
| Smoothie King Center2,700
| 16–18
|-style="background:#fcc;"
| 35
| March 11
| Philadelphia
| 
| Lauri Markkanen (23)
| Wendell Carter Jr. (9)
| Zach LaVine (7)
| United Center0
| 16–19
|-style="background:#fcc;"
| 36
| March 12
| Miami
| 
| Zach LaVine (30)
| Thaddeus Young (10)
| Zach LaVine (6)
| United Center0
| 16–20
|-style="background:#cfc;"
| 37
| March 14
| Toronto
| 
| Patrick Williams (23)
| Wendell Carter Jr. (11)
| Satoranský, Young (7)
| United Center0
| 17–20
|-style="background:#cfc;"
| 38
| March 16
| Oklahoma City
| 
| Zach LaVine (40)
| Carter Jr., Young (9)
| Tomáš Satoranský (8)
| United Center0
| 18–20
|-style="background:#fcc;"
| 39
| March 17
| San Antonio
| 
| Zach LaVine (29)
| Patrick Williams (14)
| Tomáš Satoranský (7)
| United Center0
| 18–21
|-style="background:#fcc;"
| 40
| March 19
| @ Denver
| 
| Zach LaVine (32)
| Thaddeus Young (10)
| Thaddeus Young (6)
| Ball Arena0
| 18–22
|-style="background:#cfc;"
| 41
| March 21
| @ Detroit
| 
| Zach LaVine (18)
| Daniel Gafford (11)
| Tomáš Satoranský (9)
| Little Caesars Arena750
| 19–22
|-style="background:#fcc;"
| 42
| March 22
| Utah
| 
| Zach LaVine (27)
| Thaddeus Young (9)
| LaVine, Satoranský (4)
| United Center0
| 19–23
|-style="background:#fcc;"
| 43
| March 24
| Cleveland
| 
| Zach LaVine (22)
| Wendell Carter Jr. (9)
| LaVine, Satoranský (4)
| United Center0
| 19–24
|-style="background:#fcc;"
| 44
| March 27
| @ San Antonio
| 
| Nikola Vučević (21)
| Nikola Vučević (9)
| Thaddeus Young (9)
| AT&T Center3,334
| 19–25
|-style="background:#fcc;"
| 45
| March 29
| @ Golden State
| 
| Nikola Vučević (21)
| Nikola Vučević (9)
| Tomáš Satoranský (8)
| Chase Center0
| 19–26
|-style="background:#fcc;"
| 46
| March 31
| @ Phoenix
| 
| Nikola Vučević (24)
| Markkanen, Vučević, Young (10)
| Tomáš Satoranský (7)
| Phoenix Suns Arena3,459
| 19–27

|-style="background:#fcc;"
| 47
| April 2
| @ Utah
| 
| Thaddeus Young (25)
| Nikola Vučević (8)
| Satoranský, Valentine, Vučević (4)
| Vivint Arena5,546
| 19–28
|-style="background:#cfc;"
| 48
| April 4
| Brooklyn
| 
| Zach LaVine (25)
| Nikola Vučević (13)
| Tomáš Satoranský (11)
| United Center0
| 20–28
|-style="background:#cfc;"
| 49
| April 6
| @ Indiana
| 
| Nikola Vučević (32)
| Nikola Vučević (17)
| LaVine, White (6)
| Bankers Life Fieldhouse0
| 21–28
|-style="background:#cfc;"
| 50
| April 8
| @ Toronto
| 
| LaVine, Vučević (22)
| Daniel Theis (10)
| Zach LaVine (13)
| Amalie Arena0
| 22–28
|-style="background:#fcc;"
| 51
| April 9
| @ Atlanta
| 
| Zach LaVine (50)
| Nikola Vučević (10)
| Tomáš Satoranský (10)
| State Farm Arena996
| 22–29
|-style="background:#fcc;"
| 52
| April 11
| @ Minnesota
| 
| Zach LaVine (30)
| Thaddeus Young (8)
| LaVine, Satoranský (6)
| Target Center1,436
| 22–30
|-style="background:#fcc;"
| 53
| April 12
| @ Memphis
| 
| Zach LaVine (21)
| Nikola Vučević (10)
| Zach LaVine (9)
| FedExForum2,194
| 22–31
|-style="background:#fcc;"
| 54
| April 14
| Orlando
| 
| Zach LaVine (30)
| Nikola Vučević (11)
| Zach LaVine (7)
| United Center0
| 22–32
|-style="background:#fcc;"
| 55
| April 16
| Memphis
| 
| Coby White (27)
| Nikola Vučević (14)
| Coby White (7)
| United Center0
| 22–33
|-style="background:#cfc;"
| 56
| April 17
| Cleveland
| 
| Nikola Vučević (25)
| Nikola Vučević (7)
| Coby White (9)
| United Center0
| 23–33
|-style="background:#cfc;"
| 57
| April 19
| @ Boston
| 
| Nikola Vučević (29)
| Nikola Vučević (9)
| Coby White (7)
| TD Garden0
| 24–33
|-style="background:#fcc;"
| 58
| April 21
| @ Cleveland
| 
| Lauri Markkanen (16)
| Thaddeus Young (8)
| Coby White (6)
| Rocket Mortgage FieldHouse0
| 24–34
|-style="background:#cfc;"
| 59
| April 22
| Charlotte
| 
| Vučević, White, Young (18)
| Nikola Vučević (16)
| Tomáš Satoranský (7)
| United Center0
| 25–34
|-style="background:#fcc;"
| 60
| April 24
| @ Miami
| 
| Coby White (31)
| Nikola Vučević (14)
| Nikola Vučević (6)
| AmericanAirlines Arena0
| 25–35
|-style="background:#cfc;"
| 61
| April 26
| @ Miami
| 
| Nikola Vučević (24)
| Daniel Theis (12)
| Thaddeus Young (8)
| AmericanAirlines Arena0
| 26–35
|-style="background:#fcc;"
| 62
| April 28
| @ New York
| 
| Nikola Vučević (26)
| Nikola Vučević (18)
| Coby White (9)
| Madison Square Garden1,981
| 26–36
|-style="background:#fcc;"
| 63
| April 30
| Milwaukee
| 
| Coby White (21)
| Nikola Vučević (15)
| Coby White (7)
| United Center0
| 26–37

|-style="background:#fcc;"
| 64
| May 1
| @ Atlanta
| 
| Thaddeus Young (20)
| Lauri Markkanen (11)
| Thaddeus Young (9)
| State Farm Arena3,053
| 26–38
|-style="background:#fcc;"
| 65
| May 3
| Philadelphia
| 
| Coby White (23)
| Daniel Theis (8)
| Tomáš Satoranský (6)
| United Center0
| 26–39
|-style="background:#cfc;"
| 66
| May 6
| @ Charlotte
| 
| Nikola Vučević (29)
| Nikola Vučević (14)
| Thaddeus Young (8)
| Spectrum Center3,769
| 27–39
|-style="background:#cfc;"
| 67
| May 7
| Boston
| 
| LaVine, White (25)
| Nikola Vučević (14)
| Nikola Vučević (10)
| United Center3,399
| 28–39
|-style="background:#cfc;"
| 68
| May 9
| @ Detroit
| 
| Zach LaVine (30)
| Nikola Vučević (16)
| Tomáš Satoranský (7)
| Little Caesars Arena750
| 29–39
|-style="background:#fcc;"
| 69
| May 11
| Brooklyn
| 
| Zach LaVine (41)
| Nikola Vučević (12)
| Nikola Vučević (6)
| United Center3,434
| 29–40
|-style="background:#cfc;"
| 70
| May 13
| Toronto
| 
| Zach LaVine (24)
| Nikola Vučević (16)
| Coby White (10)
| United Center3,395
| 30–40
|-style="background:#fcc;"
| 71
| May 15
| @ Brooklyn
| 
| Patrick Williams (24)
| Thaddeus Young (13)
| Coby White (6)
| Barclays Center1,773
| 30–41
|-style="background:#cfc;"
| 72
| May 16
| Milwaukee
| 
| Thaddeus Young (20)
| Christiano Felicio (8)
| Coby White (5)
| United Center3,427
| 31–41

Player statistics

|-
| align="left"|≠ || align="center"| SF/PF
| 6 || 0 || 67 || 19 || 2 || 2 || 0 || 9
|-
| align="left"| || align="center"| PG
| 44 || 0 || 450 || 67 || 56 || 9 || 0 || 136
|-
| align="left"|≠ || align="center"| SF
| 13 || 0 || 237 || 44 || 10 || 7 || 2 || 71
|-
| align="left"|† || align="center"| C
| 32 || 25 || 792 || 250 || 69 || 18 || 24 || 348
|-
| align="left"| || align="center"| PG
| 11 || 0 || 50 || 5 || 7 || 4 || 0 || 23
|-
| align="left"| || align="center"| C
| 18 || 0 || 84 || 26 || 9 || 4 || 0 || 23
|-
| align="left"|† || align="center"| C
| 31 || 11 || 383 || 103 || 17 || 11 || 34 || 147
|-
| align="left"|≠ || align="center"| SG/PG
| 16 || 0 || 128 || 19 || 6 || 10 || 4 || 41
|-
| align="left"|† || align="center"| SF
| 7 || 0 || 64 || 20 || 4 || 1 || 0 || 13
|-
| align="left"|† || align="center"| PF/C
| 13 || 0 || 94 || 15 || 4 || 2 || 7 || 26
|-
| align="left"| || align="center"| SG
| 58 || 58 || 2,034 || 289 || 282 || 46 || 27 || style=";"|1,591
|-
| align="left"| || align="center"| PF
| 51 || 26 || 1,317 || 268 || 45 || 26 || 15 || 695
|-
| align="left"| || align="center"| SG/SF
| 14 || 0 || 56 || 5 || 5 || 2 || 1 || 15
|-
| align="left"|† || align="center"| SF
| 25 || 6 || 540 || 138 || 50 || 12 || 4 || 247
|-
| align="left"| || align="center"| PG
| 58 || 18 || 1,307 || 142 || 271 || 40 || 14 || 447
|-
| align="left"| || align="center"| PG
| 56 || 25 || 1,528 || 160 || 124 || 43 || 30 || 423
|-
| align="left"|≠ || align="center"| C
| 23 || 14 || 574 || 136 || 41 || 16 || 14 || 230
|-
| align="left"| || align="center"| SG/SF
| 62 || 3 || 1,036 || 197 || 105 || 30 || 7 || 406
|-
| align="left"|≠ || align="center"| C
| 26 || 26 || 848 || 300 || 102 || 23 || 20 || 559
|-
| align="left"| || align="center"| PG
| 69 || 54 || style=";"|2,156 || 284 || style=";"|328 || 38 || 15 || 1,041
|-
| align="left"| || align="center"| PF
| style=";"|71 || style=";"|71 || 1,983 || 327 || 99 || 64 || style=";"|46 || 655
|-
| align="left"| || align="center"| PF
| 68 || 23 || 1,652 || style=";"|423 || 291 || style=";"|74 || 40 || 823
|}
After all games.
‡Waived during the season
†Traded during the season
≠Acquired during the season

Transactions

Trades

Free agency

Re-signed

Additions

Subtractions

References

Chicago Bulls seasons
Chicago
Chicago Bulls
Chicago Bulls
2020s in Chicago
Chicago Bulls
Chicago Bulls